Matching Mole (1972) is the eponymous debut album from the English Canterbury scene progressive rock band Matching Mole.

Track listing

All Songs Copyright MCPS Music.
Disc 1

 "O Caroline" (Sinclair, Wyatt) – 5:05
 "Instant Pussy" (Wyatt) – 2:59
 "Signed Curtain" (Wyatt) – 3:06
 "Part of the Dance" (Miller) – 9:16
 "Instant Kitten" (Wyatt) – 4:58
 "Dedicated to Hugh, but You Weren't Listening" (Wyatt) – 4:39
 "Beer as in Braindeer" (Wyatt) – 4:02
 "Immediate Curtain" (Wyatt) – 5:57

Esoteric Issue ECLEC22311 Bonus Tracks

 "O Caroline" (Sinclair, Wyatt) – (Single Version) - 3:33
 "Signed Curtain" (Wyatt) – (Single Edit) - 3:05
 "Part of the Dance Jam" (Miller) - 20:57

Disc 2
 "Signed Curtain (Take 2)" (Wyatt) – 5:32
 "Memories Membrane" (Wyatt) – 11:16 CBS Studio 29/12/71
 "Part of the Dance (Take 1)" (Miller) – 7:27 CBS Studio 03/01/72
 "Horse" (Wyatt) – 3:47 CBS Studio 10/01/72
 "Intermediate Kitten" (Wyatt) – 9:54 BBC Radio One Peel Show January 1972
 "Marchides/Instant Pussy/Smoke Signal" (MacRae, Wyatt) – 19:36 BBC Radio One Peel Show April 1972

Personnel

Matching Mole
Phil Miller – guitar
David Sinclair – piano, Hammond organ
Bill MacCormick – bass
Robert Wyatt – drums, voice, Mellotron, piano (3)

Additional musicians
Dave MacRae – electric piano

Production
Arranged & produced by Matching Mole
Recorded & engineered by Richard Dodd & Mike Fitzhenry
Assistant engineer: Phillip Beckwith

References

Matching Mole albums
Robert Wyatt albums
1972 debut albums
CBS Records albums